State Trunk Highway 51 (often called Highway 51, STH-51 or WIS 51) was a number assigned to two different state highways in the U.S. state of Wisconsin:
Highway 51 from 1917 to 1923, along the current route of U.S. Highway 63 from Turtle Lake to Spooner.
Highway 51 from 1923 to 1936, currently routed as Highway 72 from Ellsworth to Downsville.
For the highway in Wisconsin numbered 51 since 1926, see U.S. Highway 51.

51
U.S. Route 63